Timothy Joseph Spehr (born July 2, 1966) is an American former professional baseball player. He played in Major League Baseball as a catcher for the Kansas City Royals (1991, 1997 and 1998–99), Montreal Expos (1993–96), Atlanta Braves (1997) and New York Mets (1998). 

Spehr played college baseball for the Arizona State Sun Devils baseball team. He was not known for his offense, but he did have some power. In his first at-bat with the Atlanta Braves in 1997, he hit a grand slam (the first of two in the game, the second by Ryan Klesko) to help power a comeback from a 6–0 deficit to the Phillies. Only once did he hit above .250, when he had nine hits in 35 at-bats for the Expos in 1994.

Spehr's best season was his last, where he set career highs in many offensive categories.

References

External links
, or Retrosheet, or Venezuela Winter League

1966 births
Living people
American expatriate baseball players in Canada
Appleton Foxes players
Arizona State Sun Devils baseball players
Atlanta Braves players
Baseball City Royals players
Baseball players from Missouri
Kansas City Royals players
Leones del Caracas players
American expatriate baseball players in Venezuela
Louisville RiverBats players
Major League Baseball catchers
Memphis Chicks players
Montreal Expos players
New York Mets players
Norfolk Tides players
Omaha Royals players
Ottawa Lynx players
Pawtucket Red Sox players
People from Excelsior Springs, Missouri
Richmond Braves players
St. Lucie Mets players